Grant Edmeades (born 9 September 1992) is a South African cricketer. He played in twenty-one first-class, eight List A, and five Twenty20 matches for Boland and Western Province from 2012 to 2016.

See also
 List of Boland representative cricketers

References

External links
 

1992 births
Living people
South African cricketers
Boland cricketers
Western Province cricketers
Place of birth missing (living people)